Night Shot – The Remixes is a 2009 remix album by Ruby Isle. It was released through iTunes on November 24, 2009 and was released as an on-demand CDR through Amazon.com on April 7, 2010

Track listing
"So Damn High" (Will Eastman Club Edit) (4:38)
"Hey Hey Hey" (Le Chansons Remix) (3:13)
"No Sweatpants" (Aaron Lemay Remix) (2:35)
"Atom Bombs" (Immuzikation Remix) (2:54)
"Night Shot" (GraveRobbers Arena Rock '85 Remix) (3:12)
"Someday" (feat. Kathie Pony Hixon Smitth) (Onslaught of the Aquamen Remix) (2:52)
"So Damn High" (Stay Free Maxi Mix) (2:54)
"Stand Back" (Incesteral Maneuvers in the Dark Mix) (2:41)
"Night Shot" (Invasion of the Pussy Snatchers Mix) (2:37)
"All the Angels" (The Gold Party Remix) (3:16)
"Miracles" (Food Team Remix) (4:20)
"So Damn High" (Christian Fritz Remix)	(5:31)
"All the Angels" (Big Fun 4ever's SVU Mix) (4:33)

References

2009 albums
Mark Mallman albums